Wethau is a municipality in the Burgenlandkreis district, in Saxony-Anhalt, Germany. Since 1 January 2010 it has included the former municipality of Gieckau.

References

Burgenlandkreis